The 2008 United States House of Representatives election in Montana took place on Tuesday, November 4, 2008. Incumbent Representative Denny Rehberg sought re-election; he was originally elected in 2000 with 52% of the vote. He was formerly a Billings area rancher, state legislator (1984–90) and Montana Lieutenant Governor (1991–97).

Match-up summary

Democratic primary

Candidates
John Driscoll, former Speaker of the Montana House of Representatives and candidate for U.S. Senate in 1978
Jim Hunt, attorney
Robert Candee, perennial candidate

Results

Republican primary

Candidates
Denny Rehberg, incumbent U.S. Congressman

Results

General Election

Results

References

External links 
2008 Election Information from the Montana Secretary of State
U.S. Congress candidates for Montana at Project Vote Smart
Montana U.S. House Races from 2008 Race Tracker
Campaign contributions for Montana congressional races from OpenSecrets
District 01
Election 2008 full coverage from The Missoulian

2008
Montana
United States House of Representatives